Chabazimakhi (Dargwa: Чабазимахьи) is a rural locality (a selo) in Aymaumakhinskoye Rural Settlement, Sergokalinsky District, Republic of Dagestan, Russia. The population was 182 as of 2010. There is 1 street.

Geography 
Chabazimakhi is located 22 km southwest of Sergokala (the district's administrative centre) by road. Aymaumakhi and Miglakasimakhi are the nearest rural localities.

Nationalities 
Dargins live there.

References 

Rural localities in Sergokalinsky District